Myeongjong may refer to:
 Myeongjong of Goryeo (r. 1170–1197)
 Myeongjong of Joseon (r. 1545–1567)

See also
 Mingzong (disambiguation)

Temple name disambiguation pages